Calathus gonzalezi is a species of ground beetle from the Platyninae subfamily that is endemic to the Canary Islands.

References

gonzalezi
Beetles described in 1956
Endemic beetles of the Canary Islands